John Wray (born John Griffith Malloy; February 13, 1887 – April 5, 1940) was an American character actor of stage and screen.

Career
Wray was one of the many Broadway actors to descend on Hollywood in the aftermath of the sound revolution, and quickly appeared in a variety of substantial character roles, such as the Arnold Rothstein-like gangster in The Czar of Broadway (1930); Himmelstoss, the sadistic drill instructor in All Quiet on the Western Front (1930); and as the contortionist the Frog in the remake of The Miracle Man (1932), in the role previously played by Lon Chaney in the 1919 original.

Wray's roles grew increasingly smaller as the decade progressed but he was very visible as the starving farmer threatening to kill Gary Cooper's Longfellow Deeds in Frank Capra's classic Mr. Deeds Goes to Town (1936) and as the warden in Fritz Lang's You Only Live Once (1937).

On Broadway, Wray performed in Achilles Had a Heel (1935), Tin Pan Alley (1928), Nightstick (1927), Broadway (1926), The Enemy (1925), Silence (1924), Polly Preferred (1923), The Nightcap (1921), The Ouija Board (1920), Richelieu  (1917), The Weavers (1915), When the Young Vine Blooms (1915), Hamlet (1913), and The Merchant of Venice (1913).

Partial filmography

 New York Nights (1929) - Joe Prividi
 All Quiet On The Western Front (1930) - Himmelstoss
 The Czar of Broadway (1930) - Morton Bradstreet
 Quick Millions (1931) - Kenneth Stone
 Silence (1931) - Harry Silvers
 Safe in Hell (1931) - Egan
 The Woman from Monte Carlo (1932) - Cmdr. Brambourg
 High Pressure (1932) - Jimmy Moore
 The Miracle Man (1932) - The Frog
 The Mouthpiece (1932) - Mr. Barton
 The Rich Are Always with Us (1932) - Clark Davis
 Miss Pinkerton (1932) - Hugo
 Doctor X (1932) - Dr. Haines
 I Am a Fugitive from a Chain Gang (1932) - Nordine (uncredited)
 The Death Kiss (1932) - Detective Lieut. Sheehan
 Central Park (1932) - Robert Smiley
 The Match King (1932) - Foreman of Janitors
 After Tonight (1933) - Mitika, the Gypsy Contact
 Lone Cowboy (1933) - Bill O'Neal
 Bombay Mail (1934) - Giovanni Martini
 The Big Shakedown (1934) - Higgins
 The Crosby Case (1934) - Giovanni Martini
 The Most Precious Thing in Life (1934) - Carter
 The Love Captive (1934) - Jules Glass
 Green Eyes (1934) - Inspector Crofton
 The Defense Rests (1934) - Michael Cooney
 Fifteen Wives (1934) - Jason Getty
 The Cat's-Paw (1934) - Man on Street (uncredited)
 Embarrassing Moments (1934) - Slug
 The Captain Hates the Sea (1934) - Mr. Jeddock
 I'll Fix It (1934) - Fletcher
 I Am a Thief (1934) - Antonio Porricci
 The Whole Town's Talking (1935) - Henchman Harry (uncredited)
 The Great Hotel Murder (1935) - Feets Moore
 Stranded (1935) - Mike Gibbons
 Men Without Names (1935) - Sam 'Red' Hammond
 Atlantic Adventure (1935) - Mitts Coster
 Ladies Love Danger (1935) - Lieutenant Roberts
 Bad Boy (1935) - Fred Larkin
 Frisco Kid (1935) - The Weasel
 Mr. Deeds Goes to Town (1936) - Farmer
 Poor Little Rich Girl (1936) - Flagin
 A Son Comes Home (1936) - Gas Station Owner
 Sworn Enemy (1936) - Lang, a Gangster
 The Devil Is a Sissy (1936) - Priest (uncredited)
 The President's Mystery (1936) - Shane
 Valiant Is the Word for Carrie (1936) - George Darnley
 A Man Betrayed (1936) - Sparks
 We Who Are About to Die (1937) - Jerry Daley
 You Only Live Once (1937) - Warden Wheeler
 Outcast (1937) - Hank Simmerson
 Circus Girl (1937) - Roebling
 The Devil Is Driving (1937) - Joe Peters
 On Such a Night (1937) - Guard Rumann
 The Women Men Marry (1937) - Brother Nameless
 The Black Doll (1938) - Walling
 Making the Headlines (1938) - Herbert Sandford
 Gangs of New York (1938) - Maddock
 Reformatory (1938) - Guard (uncredited)
 Professor Beware (1938) - Head Lawyer (uncredited)
 Tenth Avenue Kid (1938) - Joe Turner
 Spawn of the North (1938) - Dr. Sparks
 Boys Town (1938) - Weasel (uncredited)
 Crime Takes a Holiday (1938) - Howell
 A Man to Remember (1938) - Tom Johnson
 Pacific Liner (1939) - Metcalfe
 Risky Business (1939) - Silas
 Almost a Gentleman (1939) - 'Crack' Williams
 Each Dawn I Die (1939) - Pete Kassock
 Winter Carnival (1939) -  Poultry Truck Driver (uncredited)
 Smuggled Cargo (1939) - Chris Hays
 Golden Boy (1939) - Chocolate Drop's Manager (uncredited)
 Blackmail (1939) - Diggs
 The Cat and the Canary (1939) - Hendricks
 The Amazing Mr. Williams (1939) - Stanley
 Gone with the Wind (1939) - prison gang overseer (uncredited)
 Remember the Night (1940) - Hank
 Swiss Family Robinson (1940) - Ramsey
 The Man from Dakota (1940) - Mr. Carpenter
 Outside the Three-Mile Limit (1940) - Ship's Captain (uncredited)
 The Doctor Takes a Wife (1940) - Joe - Farmer (uncredited) (final film role)

References

External links

 

1887 births
1940 deaths
American male film actors
American male stage actors
20th-century American male actors
Male actors from Philadelphia